This is a list of cattle herd books (breed registries) recognised as authoritative for their breed.

List

References

Cattle herd
Cattle breeds